Bart's Books in Ojai, California is a bookstore founded by Richard Bartindale in 1964. It is mostly an outdoor bookstore, and some books are available for sale at all hours. Shelves of books face the street, and patrons are asked to drop coins into the door's coin box to pay for any books they take whenever the store is closed.

Bart's has been featured in documentaries, television news programs, newspaper and magazine articles, novels, and Hollywood movies. One television documentary had a hidden camera in a van parked across the street to study the honesty of people: how many people actually put money in the coinbox after hours to pay for books they took when no one was around.  The store was also featured in Easy A, a 2010 American teen comedy movie.

External links
"About" on the Bart's Books website
"Ojai, Calif.: The Anti-L.A", October 16, 2005, Washington Post
 "California's Tranquil Ojai Valley", November 6, 1988, New York Times

References 

Bookstores in California
Ojai, California
Buildings and structures in Ventura County, California
Companies based in Ventura County, California
Retail buildings in California
Tourist attractions in Ventura County, California
Independent bookstores of the United States